The Division of Hoddle was an Australian Electoral Division in Victoria. The division was created in 1949 and abolished in 1955. It was named for Robert Hoddle, the surveyor who laid out the street plan of the City of Melbourne. It was located in the inner suburbs of Melbourne, including Carlton, Collingwood and Fitzroy, and was a safe seat for the Australian Labor Party.

Members

Election results

Hoddle
Constituencies established in 1949
1949 establishments in Australia
Constituencies disestablished in 1955
1955 disestablishments in Australia